Salacia is Neptune's wife in Roman mythology.

Salacia may also refer to :
 Salacia (plant), a genus of plants in the family Celastraceae
 Salacia (hydrozoan), a genus of hydroids in the family Sertulariidae
 120347 Salacia, minor planet in the Kuiper belt
 A fictional project in the video game Death by Degrees
 An ancient Roman town and short-lived bishopric in Portugal, in the present-day Alcácer do Sal Municipality
 The main setting of the series Sea Princesses.